Private Collection is a 1972 Australian black comedy film that marked the feature debuts of Pamela Stephenson and Michael Caton.

Plot
Two rival art collectors, Henry Phillips and Joseph Tibbsworth, engage the services of George Kleptoman, a thief, to steal from each other. In the meantime Mary Ann, Henry's bored wife, has acquired a secret boyfriend and plans to murder him.

Cast
Peter Reynolds as Henry Phillips
Pamela Stephenson as Mary Ann Phillips
Brian Blain as Joseph Tibbsworth
Grahame Bond as George Kleptoman
John Paramor as The Boyfriend
Noel Ferrier as Chief Inspector
Jerry Thomas as Superintendent
Les Foxcroft as The Citizen

Production
The film was shot on 16mm in Sydney in January 1972. It was the first movie with investment from the Australian Film Development Corporation to be publicly shown.

It premiered at the Sydney Film Festival in June of that year.

References

External links

Private Collection at Oz Movies

1970s black comedy films
Australian black comedy films
1972 comedy films
1972 drama films
1972 films
1970s English-language films
1970s Australian films